Events in the year 1999 in Italy.

Incumbents
President - Oscar Luigi Scalfaro
Prime Minister – Massimo D'Alema

Events
24 June–4 July: The 1999 IFAF World Cup is held in Palermo
1-11 September - 56th Venice International Film Festival
 
1999 European Parliament election in Italy

1999 European Parliament election in Veneto

Sport

Athletics
1999 IAAF World Half Marathon Championships

Canoeing
1999 ICF Canoe Sprint World Championships

Cycling
1999 Giro d'Italia
1999 UCI Road World Championships

Football
Serie A 1999–2000
Serie B 1998–99
Serie B 1999–2000
1999 Supercoppa Italiana

Motor racing
1999 Italian Grand Prix

Volleyball
1999 Women's European Volleyball Championship

Water Polo
1999 Women's European Water Polo Championship
1999 Men's European Water Polo Championship

Deaths
 September 26 – Giuseppe Ballerio, footballer (b. 1909)

See also
 1999 in Italian television
 List of Italian films of 1999

References

 
Years of the 20th century in Italy
1990s in Italy
Italy
Italy